NASL Final 1974 was the championship match of the 1974 season, between the expansion Los Angeles Aztecs and the Miami Toros.  The match was played on August 25, 1974 at the Orange Bowl, in Miami, Florida. The teams played to a, 3–3, draw, and after a short break the game moved directly to a penalty shoot-out. Los Angeles won the shoot-out, 5–3, and were crowned the 1974 champions. This was the second consecutive year that an expansion team won the NASL title

Background

Los Angeles Aztecs
The Los Angeles Aztecs qualified for the playoffs by virtue of winning the Western Division with 110 points. The point total earned them a quarterfinal bye in the playoffs. The Aztecs defeated the Northern Division champion Boston Minutemen, 2–0, in a semifinal game played on August 17, 1974 at ELAC Stadium in Monterey Park, California to advance to the finals.

Miami Toros

The Miami Toros qualified for the playoffs by virtue of winning the Eastern Division with 107 points. They were also given a quarterfinal bye in the playoffs. The Toros defeated the Central Division champion Dallas Tornado, 3–1, in a semifinal game played on August 17, 1974 at Tamiami Stadium to advance to the finals.

Game site controversy
Although the Aztecs had a league-best record and points total, and rightly should have hosted the championship final, CBS intervened and strongly influenced the NASL's decision to play the match in Miami. CBS was under contract to air the game live and was unwilling to black-out the large Southern California viewing audience. At the time it was the standard in many U.S.-based sports for the host market not to broadcast games locally unless they were sold out. At the time, the Los Angeles Memorial Coliseum had a capacity of 94,500 and, even in a best-case scenario, an Aztecs sell-out was unlikely. Moreover, in an effort by CBS to capture more viewers during the peak East Coast time slot, a Los Angeles-hosted game would have begun at 12:30 (PDT) local time.

The league recognized that both these factors would be detrimental to ticket sales and agreed to move the game to the Miami Orange Bowl with a 3:30 (EDT) local start. CBS had also stepped in the previous week and forced the Toros to play their semi-final match at the much-smaller Tamiami Stadium in Tamiami Park. This was done so that if Miami did win, CBS's production crews would have a full week for set-up in the Orange Bowl stadium.

Match details 

 

1974 NASL Champions: Los Angeles Aztecs

Television: CBS
Announcers: Frank Glieber, Clive Toye, Kyle Rote, Jr.

Match Statistics

See also 
 1974 North American Soccer League season

References

External links
 

1974
 
1974
August 1974 sports events in the United States
1974 in sports in Florida
Sports competitions in Miami
Soccer in Florida
Association football penalty shoot-outs